Celia Rowlson-Hall is an American dancer, choreographer, actress and film director. She has choreographed numerous music videos and commercials, and has directed several short films. Her debut feature film, MA, was released in 2015.

Early life
Rowlson-Hall grew up in Urbanna, Virginia, and graduated from the University of North Carolina School of the Arts in 2006 with a Bachelor of Fine Arts in dance.

Career
Rowlson-Hall moved to New York after finishing college and initially worked in theater dance and choreography. She was mentored by New York choreographer Faye Driscoll, and won a Bessie Award for performance in Driscoll's 837 Venice Blvd in 2009. She first became involved in filmmaking in 2008, when director Ray Tintori hired her to choreograph the music video for MGMT's song "Electric Feel". In 2010, she directed her first short film, Prom Night, in which she also cast herself; it was nominated for a Grand Jury Award at South by Southwest. She went on to direct two further short films, The Audition (2012) and Si Nos Dejan (2013).

In 2013, Rowlson-Hall began working as a choreographer on the HBO series Girls; she also choreographed Girls creator Lena Dunham in a video for Vogue magazine. She has choreographed commercials for clients including Lee Jeans and Kate Spade New York, and music videos for artists including Alicia Keys and Sleigh Bells. She was named one of Filmmaker magazine's "25 New Faces of Independent Film" in 2015.

Rowlson-Hall's first feature film, MA (2015), is a modern retelling of the story of the Virgin Mary in which Rowlson-Hall plays the lead role. The film, which Rowlson-Hall funded via Kickstarter, was screened at the 72nd Venice International Film Festival and AFI Fest. In 2017, she created the short film (The [End) of History Illusion] for Miu Miu as the 14th installment in their Women's Tales series.

Rowlson-Hall portrays adult Sophie in the 2022 film Aftersun.

Personal life
In September 2018, Rowlson-Hall married Mia Lidofsky, a filmmaker whom she had met in 2013 when they worked together on Girls.

References

External links

Living people
American choreographers
American women choreographers
21st-century American dancers
American female dancers
American film directors
American women film directors
American LGBT artists
LGBT people from Virginia
University of North Carolina School of the Arts alumni
People from Urbanna, Virginia
Year of birth missing (living people)
Bessie Award winners
21st-century American women
21st-century LGBT people